Anselmo may refer to:

It may also refer to:

Places 
Anselmo, Alberta, Canada
Anselmo, Nebraska, US
San Anselmo, California, US

People

Given name
Anselmo (given name), various individuals
Anselmo de Moraes (born 1989), Brazilian football player known by the mononym Anselmo
Anselmo Cardoso (born 1984), Portuguese football player known by the mononym Anselmo
Anselmo Eyegue (born 1990), Equatoguinean football player known by the mononym Anselmo

Family name
Fortunato Anselmo (1883–1965), Italian diplomat
Giovanni Anselmo (born 1934), Italian artist
Mary Anselmo, American founder of PanAmSat
Peregrino Anselmo (1902–1975), Uruguayan football player
Phil Anselmo (born 1968), American heavy metal vocalist best known as the frontman of Pantera
Rene Anselmo (1926–1995), American television personality
Tony Anselmo (born 1960), American animator and voice-over actor
Tony Anselmo (Canadian football) (1918–2009), Canadian community builder for the Calgary Stampeders Football Club
Vic Anselmo, Latvian singer-songwriter
Nicolas Anselmo (French actor) (born 1998)

Fiction
Anselmo, a character in "The Impertinently Curious Man", a story-within-the-story in Don Quixote
Anselmo, the elderly guide of Robert Jordan in the novel For Whom the Bell Tolls by Ernest Hemingway
Anselmo, the father whose death instigates the events of the Spanish Film Cría Cuervos

Others
Universidad San Anselmo de Canterbury, a seminary of the Episcopal Anglican Church of Chile

See also
Anselm (disambiguation), the English form of the name
Anselmus (disambiguation), the Latin form of the name
Ansel (disambiguation) and Ansell (disambiguation), the German form of the name
St Anselm (disambiguation), various people
Saint Anselm's (disambiguation), various places